Ieva Pulvere (née Krastiņa; born 22 July 1990) is a Latvian basketball player for Galatasaray and Latvia women's national basketball team.

Club career
On 12 August 2022, she signed with Galatasaray of the Turkish Women's Basketball Super League (TKBL).

National team career
Krastiņa is two-time bronze medallist of the FIBA Europe Under-20 Championship. She is 2009 Latvian champion.

References

External links
FIBA Europe profile

1990 births
Living people
Latvian expatriate basketball people in Lithuania
Latvian women's basketball players
People from Cēsis
Shooting guards
Galatasaray S.K. (women's basketball) players